KEVA Planks are cuboid wooden block toys for children and adults.  Each block is sized approximately 1/4 inch (6.35 mm) x 3/4 inch (19.05 mm) x 4 1/2 inches (114.3 mm). The blocks are available for sale in maple, that is produced in the United States, and less expensive imported pine versions.

KEVA Planks started out as a simple construction set that is unusual because they only use one piece and no connectors in glue, in contrast to other building sets that often have specific instructions and require sorting. It has developed into a teaching tool used in classrooms and enjoyed in homes.

A number of museums have KEVA exhibits for hands on experience with design and construction including:
 Da Vinci Science Center of Allentown, PA
 Exploration Place of The Sedgwick County Science and Discovery Center of Wichita, Kansas
 Fleet Science Center in San Diego, CA
 Kalamazoo Air Zoo of Kalamazoo, MI 
 Lawrence Hall of Science at University of California, Berkeley, CA
 Rochester Museum and Science Center in Rochester, NY 
 Science World (Vancouver) in Vancouver, BC
 Kaleideum of Winston-Salem, NC
Discovery Park of America in Union City, TN

The tallest tower built with KEVA planks was 51 feet, 8 inches constructed at the National Building Museum in 2006.

KEVA planks is a privately owned company located in Virginia. Mindware, a division of Oriental Trading subsidiary of Berkshire Hathaway, is the exclusive licensee of many KEVA Planks products.

KEVA Planks in Educational Settings 
KEVA Planks are used in schools, libraries, museums, and maker spaces. They are a teaching tool that can be used as a manipulative to teach subjects including math, science, geography, history, and humanities. They were featured at Destination Imagination Global Finals in Knoxville, Tennessee in 2011. 

Beginning in 2015, KEVA Planks traveled with Share Fair Nation STEMosphere events and was one of the most popular sessions in the professional development workshops. STEMosphere highlights innovative and creative teaching tools.

KEVA Planks were named number 3 in Worlds of Learning's Top Ten Makerspace Favorites of 2016.

They have been used as "de-stressors" at libraries at Duke University and the University of Virginia.

References

See also
 Kapla

External links
 

Toy brands
Construction toys
Educational toys
Wooden toys